Hadra can be:

Hadra, Poland, a village
Hadra (genus), a genus of snails
Haḍra (or Hadhra), rituals performed by Sufi orders
Hadra vase, a type of ancient Greek pottery